Pantoporia paraka, the Perak lascar, is a species of nymphalid butterfly found in tropical and subtropical Asia.

References

Paraka
Butterflies of Asia
Fauna of Pakistan
Butterflies of Singapore
Butterflies of Indochina
Butterflies described in 1879